Liset Herrera Blanco (born ) is a Cuban female volleyball player. She is part of the Cuba women's national volleyball team.

She participated in the 2015 FIVB Volleyball World Grand Prix.
On club level she played for Matanzas in 2015.

References

1998 births
Living people
Cuban women's volleyball players
Place of birth missing (living people)